Mexico–Tanzania relations are the diplomatic relations between the United Mexican States and the United Republic of Tanzania. Both nations are members of the United Nations.

History
Mexico and Tanzania established diplomatic relations on 19 February 1973. That same year, Mexico opened an embassy in the Tanzanian capital of Dar es Salaam. In April 1975, Tanzanian President Julius Nyerere paid a six-day official visit to Mexico. During his visit, he met with Mexican President Luis Echeverría and they discussed the issues facing Africa at the time. Furthermore, President Nyerere asked Mexico to take an active role in assisting Tanzania with building their new capital at Dodoma by allowing architects, planners and students to come from Tanzania and study at Mexican universities and for Mexican technicians to travel to Tanzania to work in developing projects for the new capital. Agreements were signed between both Presidents to deepen agricultural and trade relations between both nations.

In July 1975, Mexican President Luis Echeverría paid a four-day state visit to Tanzania. During President Echeverría's visit; he visited Serengeti National Park and the new capital of Dodoma. Both nations signed an agreement to increase scholarships for up to 30 students to study in each nation and for Mexico to increase financial assistance to Tanzanian henequen farmers.

In 1980, Mexico closed its embassy in Tanzania due to financial restraints. In 1981 and in 1986, President Nyerere returned to Mexico for official visits. In December 2006, Tanzanian Prime Minister Edward Lowassa and Vice-President Mohamed Gharib Bilal attended the inauguration ceremony for Mexican President Felipe Calderón. In 2008, Tanzanian Vice-President Ali Mohamed Shein and Minister of Health, David Mwakyusa, paid a visit to Mexico to attend the International AIDS Conference. 

In 2009, Mexico became the first Latin American nation to be invited to attend and show at the Zanzibar International Film Festival, the best well known cultural event in East Africa. In 2011, both nations celebrated 38 years of diplomatic relations. In April 2013, Mexican Foreign Undersecretary Lourdes Aranda Bezaury paid a visit to Tanzania to promote the candidacy to the World Health Organization for Dr. Herminio Blanco Mendoza.

High-level visits

High-level visits from Mexico to Tanzania
 President Luis Echeverría (1975)
 Foreign Undersecretary Lourdes Aranda Bezaury (2013)

High-level visits from Tanzania to Mexico
 President Julius Nyerere (1975, 1981, 1986)
 Prime Minister Edward Lowassa (2006)
 Vice President Mohamed Gharib Bilal (2006, 2012)
 Vice President Ali Mohamed Shein (2008)
 Minister of Health David Mwakyusa (2008)

Bilateral agreements
Both nations have signed bilateral agreements such as an Agreement of Cooperation in Health (2007) and a Memorandum of Understanding for the Establishment of a Mechanism of Consultation in Matters of Mutual Interest (2008).

Trade
In 2018, trade between Mexico and Tanzania totaled US$4 million. Mexico's main export to Tanzania include: medicine, electrical equipment and adaptors. Tanzania's main exports to Mexico include: mimosa extract and wood based products.

Diplomatic missions 
 Mexico is accredited to Tanzania from its embassy in Nairobi, Kenya and maintains an honorary consulate in Dar es Salaam.
 Tanzania is accredited to Mexico from its embassy in Washington, D.C., United States.

References

 
Tanzania
Mexico